Salarpur is a village in Sataon block of Rae Bareli district, Uttar Pradesh, India. It is located 8 km from Raebareli, the district headquarters. As of 2011, its population is 1,462, in 288 households. It has one primary school and no healthcare facilities.

The 1961 census recorded Salarpur as comprising 1 hamlet, with a total population of 631 people (337 male and 294 female), in 115 households and 115 physical houses. The area of the village was given as 670 acres.

The 1981 census recorded Salarpur as having a population of 887 people, in 182 households, and having an area of 269.53 hectares. The main staple foods were given as wheat and rice.

References

Villages in Raebareli district